Tropical Storm Karen was a weak tropical storm that impacted the Lesser Antilles, Virgin Islands, and Puerto Rico in September 2019. The twelfth tropical cyclone and eleventh named storm of the 2019 Atlantic hurricane season, it originated from a tropical wave which entered the tropical Atlantic on September 14. The wave quickly organized as it neared the Windward Islands on September 20, becoming a tropical depression just two days later. The depression strengthened into Tropical Storm Karen later that day, as it moved across the southern Windward Islands. Karen weakened back to a tropical depression at 06:00 UTC on September 23. However, just 12 hours later, Karen re-intensified into a tropical storm. It then entered the central Atlantic, early the next day. Karen began to degrade on September 27, when it weakened into a tropical depression, due to strong wind shear. The system subsequently degenerated into a surface trough later that day.

Karen caused significant flooding and widespread power outages in Trinidad and Tobago. Damage on the island of Tobago reached $3.53 million (USD). Flooding and power outages also occurred in Puerto Rico where roughly 29,000 customers lost electricity. Only minimal impacts were reported in Venezuela, the remainder of the Windward Islands, and the British Virgin Islands.

Meteorological history

On September 14, a tropical wave moved off the west coast of Africa. The wave was accompanied by a large area of convection, or showers and thunderstorms as it moved over the Cabo Verde Islands. However, convective activity started to become disorganized as the wave moved across the tropical Atlantic. The National Hurricane Center (NHC) began to monitor the system for tropical cyclogenesis on September 18. On September 20, convection began to blossom once more as the wave moved into an area favorable for development. At this time, the system was being steered to the west-northwest along the southern periphery of a subtropical ridge. At around 12:00 UTC that day, Karen passed through the Windward Islands just north of Tobago.

Early on September 23, Karen's convective pattern started to become disorganized as it moved into an area of strong northeasterly vertical wind shear and dry air. At 6:00 UTC on September 24, Karen weakened into a tropical depression as it shifted to the northeast. Early on September 25, deep convection began to slowly increase, however, thunderstorm activity remained south of the center due to north-northeasterly wind shear. Although just a few hours later, thunderstorm activity began to flourish over the storm's center. Karen began to slow its forward movement and shift northward around the western periphery of the subtropical ridge. By 18:00 UTC, the storm's center reformed slightly to the west. Later that day, Karen entered the central Atlantic.

On September 26, convection developed over Karen's center. However, later that day, Karen's circulation became elongated, and weakening occurred early on September 27. A few hours later, the NHC noted that the storm's circulation had attached to a surface boundary that extended from the remnants of Hurricane Jerry. At 12:00 UTC on September 27, Karen degraded into a tropical depression.

Preparations and impact

Trinidad and Tobago
On September 22, a Tropical Storm Warning was issued for Trinidad and Tobago. However, the warning was discontinued just a few hours later. The entire country was placed under a red alert due to the storm. Regional corporations handed out sandbags in parts of eastern and southern Trinidad. Some sports games were delayed or cancelled due to the storm. Caribbean Airlines cancelled numerous flights in the country. Residents of the country were asked to avoid floodwaters for health and safety reasons.

Heavy rainfall caused flash flooding across Trinidad and Tobago. Severe flooding was reported in southwestern Tobago and Scarborough. In Trinidad, the Sandy River overtopped its bank, causing flooding in Mason Hall. Nearby, a mudslide caused a road to shut down and a house was destroyed. In Plymouth, seven boats sank after Jetty was damaged. In Mt. Lambert, fields were inundated by floodwaters. However, most of Trinidad was spared from major damage. Some of the worst impacts in the country were located in Tobago. A road in Tobago was littered with downed trees and utility poles. During the storm, eight boats were destroyed in Roxborough, causing more than $50,000 TTD ($7,400 USD) in damage. The Tobago Emergency Management Agency (TEMA) stated that Karen caused $24 million TTD ($3.53 million USD) in damage in Tobago. TEMA also stated that it had received 88 reports of incidents related to Tropical Storm Karen.

U.S. Caribbean territories

On September 22, Tropical Storm Watches were first issued in Puerto Rico, including the Spanish Virgin Islands, and the US Virgin Islands. These were upgraded into Tropical Storm Warnings by 9:00 UTC on September 23. All were discontinued by 9:00 UTC on September 25. A flash flood warning was issued for large portions of Puerto Rico by the National Weather Service (NWS). Governor Wanda Vázquez declared a state of emergency for Puerto Rico on September 23. Schools and government buildings were shut down with the threat of heavy rainfall and flooding. Across the island, the government opened 67 shelters. In the U.S. Virgin Islands, schools and government buildings were also closed. Ports were shut down while Seaborne Airlines and Sea Flight cancelled flights between St. Croix and St. Thomas. Also on St. Thomas, traffic was closed on part of Veterans Drive between September 24–25. The Virgin Islands Waste Management Authority advised residents and solid waste haulers that Anguilla's landfill on St. Cross was closed due to deteriorating road conditions. The haulers were asked to hold the waste. Search operations for a 48-year-old woman from Kentucky who went missing at the Virgin Islands National Park had to be briefly suspended due to the storm.

Numerous roads across the island were flooded and became impassible due to mudslides and runoff. River floods were reported in Utuado, Jayuya and Yabucoa municipalities with a mudslide also occurring in Jayuya municipality. The Culebrinas River overtopped its banks, causing flooding in Aguadilla. Roughly 29,000 customers lost electricity in Puerto Rico. A mudslide blocked part of Puerto Rico Highway 14 in Aibonito. In Toa Baja, two people were trapped in a house by flooding. Another home was inundated by floodwaters in the municipality. Flooding trapped one person in their vehicle in Dorado. In the territory, a total of 217 people were displaced by the storm. The director of Puerto Rico's Disaster Management Agency, Carlos Acevedo, stated that Karen caused no major damage in Puerto Rico. In the U.S. Virgin Islands, the storm caused flash flooding, mudslides, and some power outages. Foam blocks from a refinery washed onto beaches in southern St. Croix for months after the storm. On September 25, volunteers of the Red Cross assessed damage in six Puerto Rican municipalities. Power restoration in the U.S. Virgin Islands were completed by September 28.

Elsewhere
When Karen formed on September 22, Tropical Storm Warnings were issued for Grenada and Saint Vincent and the Grenadines. These warnings were cancelled by September 23. Karen caused tropical storm conditions in Grenada, where Flood and Landslide warnings were issued. In nearby Saint Vincent and the Grenadines, a Flood Watch was issued for the country with the threat of heavy rainfall. A government shutdown occurred due to the storm on September 22. The Kingstown port briefly ceased operations that same day. Gusty winds, rough surf, and downed trees were reported on Union Island. Rough seas caused rocks to be pushed up onto a bar at the Liming in Bequia. In Venezuela, heavy rainfall affected Caracas and Güiria. In the latter, some areas lost power and several homes were flooded. On September 23, a Tropical Storm Warning was issued for the British Virgin Islands, which was later cancelled on September 25. In preparation for the storm, both public and private schools were forced to close. Many stores also closed along with banks, some clinics, ports, and airports. Strong winds and heavy rainfall were reported in portions of the islands. Falling trees snapped power lines, causing power outages. However, the Department of Disaster Management recorded no major damage.

See also

Tropical cyclones in 2019
Other storms of the same name
Hurricane Marilyn (1995) — Took a similar track through the eastern Caribbean.
Hurricane Jeanne (2004) — Affected similar areas upon formation.
Hurricane Beryl (2018) – Affected similar areas

References

External links

The National Hurricane Center's advisory archive on Tropical Storm Karen

Karen
Karen
Karen
2019 in Trinidad and Tobago